The following is a list of the 15 cantons of the Loir-et-Cher department, in France, following the French canton reorganisation which came into effect in March 2015:

 La Beauce
 Blois-1
 Blois-2
 Blois-3
 Chambord
 Montoire-sur-le-Loir
 Montrichard Val de Cher
 Le Perche
 Romorantin-Lanthenay
 Saint-Aignan
 Selles-sur-Cher
 La Sologne
 Vendôme
 Veuzain-sur-Loire
 Vineuil

References